The NWA Georgia Heavyweight Championship was the major title in the Georgia Championship Wrestling professional wrestling promotion. It started in 1964 and was unified in 1981 with the NWA National Heavyweight Championship.

The title was picked back up in 1998 by NWA Georgia, which became NWA Wildside in September 1999 when it merged with National Championship Wrestling. Along with this change, the championship became known as the NWA Wildside Heavyweight Championship. The title continued until Wildside ceased operations on April 30, 2005.

In 2012, NWA Action (later renamed NWA Atlanta) picked up the title and restored its original name. Cru Jones won the reactivated title by defeating Steve Stiles on June 23, 2012, in Stockbridge, Georgia, and vacated it in 2013. It was either unified with the Atlanta Heavyweight Championship in June 2015 or retired in February 2016.

Under the resurrection of Georgia Championship Wrestling, an announcement was made that the Georgia Heavyweight Championship would be revived and a new champion crowned on April 24, 2021.

Title history

Names

Reigns

See also
Georgia Championship Wrestling
National Wrestling Alliance
NWA Wildside

References

External links
Wrestling-Titles.com

National Wrestling Alliance championships
Georgia Championship Wrestling championships
NWA Wildside championships
Professional wrestling in Georgia (U.S. state)
National Wrestling Alliance state wrestling championships